The Battle of Catirai took place on January 7, 1569, near Catirai, Chile between the Mapuche army of Toqui Llanganabal and the Spanish army led by Martín Ruiz de Gamboa that resulted in a Mapuche victory.

History
In 1569, Llanganabal had risen to command the Moluche army with Millalelmo and other captains as his subordinates. To resist the Spanish army under Governor Melchor Bravo de Saravia that had been burning the fields and rucas on the south bank of the Bio Bio River, in the aillarehue of Catirai across from Talcamávida. Llanganabal's deputy, Millalelmo had built a strong fortress on a hill in the area in a difficult position on steep wooded slopes. Despite the warnings of Lorenzo Bernal del Mercado who had reconnoitered the position, Spaniards new to Chile and the Arauco War prevailed on Governor Saravia to order Martín Ruiz de Gamboa to take his command and attack the place.

Meanwhile, Llanganabal had gathered all his army there at their fortress to resist the attack.

Gamboa's force was badly defeated while attempting to attack up the steep thickly wooded hill into Llanganabal's fortified position.

Additional information

References

Sources
 Alonso de Góngora Marmolejo,Historia de Todas las Cosas que han Acaecido en el Reino de Chile y de los que lo han gobernado (1536-1575) (History of All the Things that Have happened in the Kingdom of Chile and of those that have governed it (1536-1575), Edición digital a partir de Crónicas del Reino de Chile, Madrid, Atlas, 1960, pp. 75–224, (on line in Spanish) (History of Chile 1536–1575)
 Capítulo LXIII De cómo el gobernador Saravia salió de Santiago para ir a la Concepción, y de cómo nombró por su general a don Miguel de Velasco, y de las cosas que acaescieron
Capítulo LXIV De cómo el gobernador Saravia hizo consulta de guerra con los capitanes que llevaba, y la plática que propuso por dónde se acertaría mejor a hacer, y de lo que se proveyó
 Capítulo LXV De cómo el gobernador Saravia envió al general don Miguel a deshacer una junta de indios, y cómo después de venido le mandó ir a deshacer el fuerte de Catiray, y donde lo desbarataron, y lo demás que acaeció
 Pedro Mariño de Lobera, Crónica del Reino de Chile , escrita por el capitán Pedro Mariño de Lobera....reducido a nuevo método y estilo por el Padre Bartolomé de Escobar. Edición digital a partir de Crónicas del Reino de Chile Madrid, Atlas, 1960, pp. 227-562 (Biblioteca de Autores Españoles ; 569-575).  Biblioteca Virtual Miguel de Cervantes (on line in Spanish) (History of Chile 1535–1595)
 Libro segundo, Parte tercera, Capítulo XXX De la entrada del doctor Saravia por presidente y gobernador de Chile, y de don Antonio de San Miguel obispo de la ciudad Imperial
 Libro segundo, Parte tercera, Capítulo XXXI De algunas batallas que tuvieron el doctor Bravo de Saravia, don Miguel de Velasco y Lorenzo Bernal contra el indio Millalermo y otros capitanes bárbaros de mucha fama
 Diego de Rosales, Historia general de el Reino de Chile, Flandes Indiano Tomo II, CAPÍTULO XL; Impr. del Mercurio, Santiago 1878, Original from Harvard University Digitized May 21, 2007
 Diego Barros Arana, Historia general de Chile. Tomo segundo, Capítulo IV Administración de la Real Audiencia (1567-1568). Principio del gobierno del doctor Bravo de Saravia (1568-1569)

Conflicts in 1569
Battles involving Spain
Battles of the Arauco War
1569 in the Captaincy General of Chile
History of Biobío Region